Terezín Initiative is a voluntary organization for survivors of the Theresienstadt Ghetto and other Holocaust survivors from the Czech lands, as well as their descendants. It publishes a journal, Časopis Terezínská iniciativa. Terezín Initiative was one of the main collaborators in an effort to create a machine-readable database of the 150,000 victims of Theresienstadt. It also helped form the Terezín Ghetto Museum, and contributed money to the project. For many years until her death in 2018,  was its president.

References

Further reading

External links
, official website
, Institut Terezínské iniciativy
The Holocaust in Bohemia and Moravia